Jineology is a form of feminism and of gender equality advocated by Abdullah Öcalan, the representative leader of the Kurdistan Workers' Party (PKK) and the broader Kurdistan Communities Union (KCK) umbrella. From the background of honor-based religious and tribal rules that confine women in Middle East societies, Öcalan said that "a country can't be free unless the women are free", and that the level of women's freedom determines the level of freedom in society at large.

Jineology is a component of democratic confederalism, a philosophy underpinning the governance of the Autonomous Administration of North and East Syria (also known as Rojava).

History 
The Kurdistan Communities Union (KCK) is an umbrella organization that includes the Democratic Union Party (PYD) and PKK. In 2005, the KCK abandoned its goal of establishing a separate Kurdish state and instead advocated for democratic confederalism. In 2012, the PYD gained control over a large portion of northern Syria and declared autonomy, implementing self-governance under the model of democratic confederalism. This region, known as Rojava or the Autonomous Administration of North and East Syria, made up around one fifth of Syrian territory before the Turkish invasion of the region in 2016. The PYD's paramilitary force consists of the People's Protection Units (YPG) and the Women's Protection Units (YPJ).

The Kurdish women’s liberation movement draws heavily upon the theory of Abdullah Öcalan, founder of the PKK. Öcalan coined the term ‘jineology’ and invented democratic confederalism, the system of government implemented in Rojava.

Definition and Ideology 
In Kurdish, the word jin (ژن) both means "woman" and comes from the root jiyan (ژیان), meaning "life". For that reason, it is sometimes translated into English as the science of women or women's science.

In Liberating life: Women's Revolution (2013), Abdullah Öcalan writes:
The extent to which society can be thoroughly transformed is determined by the extent of the transformation attained by women. Similarly, the level of woman’s freedom and equality determines the freedom and equality of all sections of society. . . . For a democratic nation, woman’s freedom is of great importance too, as liberated woman constitutes liberated society. Liberated society in turn constitutes democratic nation. Moreover, the need to reverse the role of man is of revolutionary importance.

The Kurdistan Workers' Party (PKK)'s Women’s Liberation Ideology describes jineology as "a fundamental scientific term in order to fill the gaps that the current social sciences are incapable of doing. Jineology is built on the principle that without the freedom of women within society and without a real consciousness surrounding women no society can call itself free."

Öcalan has said "a country can't be free unless the women are free", and that the level of woman's freedom determines the level of freedom in society at large. To put into context the environment this comes from, violent oppression of women exists in the region in general, the Islamic State of Iraq and the Levant (ISIL) being the most radical emanation of Namus-based subjugation of women. 

Jineology, a set of principles that includes the rejection of the nation-state system, governance through democratic confederalism, and the promotion of self-sustainability through ecological awareness and collective armament, has been embraced by Kurdish women. While these principles are seen as a means of challenging patriarchy, they are also viewed in contrast to Western feminism, which is associated with capitalism and statism. Despite this, the jineological principles embraced by Kurdish women are concerned with challenging patriarchy and the intersection of patriarchy with other forms of hegemony.

Jineology is a discipline that seeks to recover and study knowledge about women in order to challenge the belief that women are inferior or "defective" versions of men and to address the exclusion of women from intellectual history. It aims to rehabilitate and value traditionally belittled aspects of female existence, such as "women's work". Jineology recognizes that the nation-state is closely linked to patriarchy and reproduces it because it is inherently hegemonic and masculinist. To describe this interconnectedness, jineologists use the term "statism-sexism-powerism" to emphasize the inseparability of these forms of hegemony.

Jineology in Practice 
Jineology is a fundamental tenet of the KCK's democratic confederalism and as such central to the Kurds' social revolution taking place in Rojava, their de facto autonomous region in northern Syria, led by the KCK-affiliated Democratic Union Party (PYD). Consequently, women make up 40% of the Kurdish militia fighting in the Rojava conflict against the Bashar al-Assad regime and Islamic State of Iraq and the Levant (ISIL) in the Syrian Civil War. Women fight alongside men in the People's Protection Units (YPG) as well as in their own Women's Protection Units (YPJ). In the YPJ, women study the political theories of Öcalan, on whose ideology the foundations of the group were laid.For female participants in the reconstruction of northern Syria, jineology is seen as superior to Western feminism because it aims to reject all forms of hegemony, including patriarchy and positivism, in order to establish a more sustainable peace. This is because jineology is seen as more holistic and inclusive of all members of society. During the Rojava revolution, both men and women were required to study jineology and ecology, and jineology is integrated into the region's governance model rather than being treated as a separate issue focused on women's rights.

The Jineology-based agenda of "trying to break the honor-based religious and tribal rules that confine women" is controversial and overcoming controversy in conservative quarters of society in northern Syria. The development of Jineology is one of five pillars in the Kurdish women's movement in Rojava with the Kongreya Star umbrella organization, focused "on protecting each other, resisting ISIL and building an egalitarian community in the middle of a warzone." In the instance of ISIL, the YPG/YPJ resisted the organization's sexism. In the context of the Turkish invasion of the area, the YPG/YPJ has engaged in sporadic combat against these state attacks. Self-defense extends into the intellectual domain with Rojava participants claiming the right to protect themselves from epistemic attacks by making decisions and generating awareness about themselves. It is for this reason that Women's and Youth Committees were established, with veto power over decisions affecting them; it is also for this reason that women's and asayish academies exist, as well as jineology. Jineology is one of a range of courses offered at Kongreya Star's women's academy.

Bibliography 
Liberating life: Woman's Revolution. Cologne, Germany: International Initiative Edition, 2013. Abdullah Öcalan. .
Killing the Male. 1997/98. Mahir Sayın, Abdullah Öcalan (interviewee).

See also 
 Uprisings led by women
 Rojava–Islamist conflict

Notes

References

External links 
 "Crackdown in Turkey Threatens a Haven of Gender Equality Built by Kurds", The New York Times, December 2016
Democratic confederalism
Feminist movements and ideologies
Politics of the Autonomous Administration of North and East Syria